Tillo or Aydınlar is a town in the Tillo District of Siirt Province in Turkey. The town is mostly inhabited by Arabs and had a population of 2,279 in 2021.

Neighborhoods 
Tillo is divided into the neighborhoods of Fakirullah, Mücahit and Saydanlar.

Etymology 

Gallery

References

Populated places in Siirt Province
Arab settlements in Siirt Province